Shrikant Wagh  (born 9 October 1988) is an Indian cricketer who played for Pune Warriors India in the Indian Premier League (IPL) 2011. He also plays for the Vidarbha cricket team in the annual Ranji Trophy tournament.

References

External links

Indian cricketers
1988 births
Living people
People from Buldhana district
Vidarbha cricketers
Rajasthan Royals cricketers
Pune Warriors India cricketers
Central Zone cricketers

mr:कामरान खान